The Toxic Avenger III: The Last Temptation of Toxie is a 1989 American superhero comedy splatter film and the third installment of The Toxic Avenger franchise. It was directed by Lloyd Kaufman and Michael Herz.

The title is a parody of the 1988 film The Last Temptation of Christ.

Plot
Things have become peaceful again in Tromaville, putting Melvin Junko the Toxic Avenger into depression, as he can no longer fight crime and fails at normal jobs such as auto mechanic and babysitter. Claire, his blind girlfriend, may be able to see again thanks to a new groundbreaking surgery, but it will cost $347,000. Toxie takes a job as a spokesman for Apocalypse Inc., the New York-based chemical company he defeated before, since he will be paid enough for Claire's surgery. He signs the contract in his own blood. Claire has her surgery. For the first time, she sees Toxie and falls even more in love with him.

As Apocalypse Inc. comes in to promote their chemicals, the people of Tromaville are shocked to see their hero, The Toxic Avenger, agreeing with Apocalypse. Toxie's ego has inflated to a point, and he has become a yuppie. Claire unsuccessfully confronts Toxie. When Toxie sees a group of kids knocking down a poster of him and kicking it, he finally realizes what has happened. Toxie remembers a saying at church, which makes him decide to once again clean up Tromaville. He earns the trust of the people of Tromaville once again by killing a gang of Apocalypse Inc. goons who were holding hostages at the Tromaville Video Store.

He now faces the Chairman, who reveals he is actually the Devil, a green-skinned demon, and challenges Toxie to his favorite video game, "The Five Levels of Doom". The first level, Earth, involves getting sucked into the ground. When Toxie gets his head out of the ground, Mona Malfaire orders an Apocalypse thug to decapitate Toxie with a mower but it proves unsuccessful. The second level, Fire, has both Toxie and the Devil set on fire. Toxie is saved by some Tromaville residents, who douse him with water. With the Devil still on fire and laughing hysterically, Toxie resorts to urinating on the Devil, extinguishing the flames.

In the third level, Wind, the Devil kidnaps the kids of Tromaville, sends them to a mountain by bus, and unleashes strong winds that risk putting the bus over the mountain. Toxie arrives at the cliff and has the kids escape via the back door. Malfaire, in an attempt to shoot down Toxie and the kids, is crushed by the bus when it falls down the cliff. In the fourth level, Water, Toxie is put into a massive puddle in an attempt to drown him. However, Toxie escapes using a Sumo trick he learned in Japan.

The Devil unleashes the final level, in which he transforms the Toxic Avenger back into Little Melvin, who once again becomes the victim of bullying, now by Apocalypse Inc. When Claire attempts to intervene, she is once again rendered blind. While Melvin is getting picked on, Claire returns home and finds the contract. She finds an escape clause that will allow termination by an act of God. An angel, disguised as a messenger, arrives and gives Melvin a scroll. It begins to rain. Melvin is transformed back into the Toxic Avenger and Claire is able to once again see.

Melvin defeats the Devil, ripping his skin off to expose rats and bugs all over his carcass. He decapitates the Devil and throws his head to Tokyo, where a news reporter demonstrates a new hair growth formula to a customer. Having defeated Apocalypse Inc., Melvin and Claire celebrate by getting married and are now "monster and wife".

Cast
 John Altamura as The Toxic Avenger / Melvin Junko, a janitor that was mutated into a deformed superhero.
 Ron Fazio as the voice of The Toxic Avenger
 Ron Fazio also portrays an Apocalypse Inc. Executive
 Michael J. Kaplan as "Little" Melvin Junko
 Phoebe Legere as Claire, the blind girlfriend of Melvin .
 Rick Collins as Apocalypse Inc. Chairman / The Devil, the head of Apocalypse Inc.
 Lisa Gaye as Mona Malfaire, the right-hand woman of the Apocalypse Inc. Chairman
 Jessica Dublin as Mrs. Junko, the mother of Melvin.
 Dan Snow as Cigar Face, a gangster who allies with Apocalypse Inc.
 Paul Borghese as Lou Sipher
 Paul Borghese also portrays an Apocalypse Inc. executive
 Fernando Antonio, Sylvester Covin, William Decker, Joe Fleishaker, Mark Fucile, Marc Allen Ginsberg, Sal Lioni, Doug McDonald, Benny Nieves, Kariim Ratcliff, Michael Jai White, Susan Whitty, and Jeremiah Yates as Apocalypse Inc. executives

Production
The film was made along with The Toxic Avenger Part II as Lloyd Kaufman made a four-hour cut, which resulted in both Part II and this film. Mark Torgl was asked to come back as Melvin for the "final level of Doom" sequence. Due to pay issues, ultimately declined to return and was replaced by Michael J. Kaplan. However, Torgl would return to the role in Citizen Toxie: The Toxic Avenger IV.

Release

Home media
The film was later re-released as part of the 'Tox Box' DVD set and the 'Complete Toxic Avenger' 7-disc DVD set.

Reception

Critical response
The film gained many negative reviews.

External links
 
 
 

The Toxic Avenger (franchise)
1989 films
1989 horror films
1980s comedy horror films
American comedy horror films
Films directed by Lloyd Kaufman

American independent films
American sequel films
American splatter films
The Devil in film
Troma Entertainment films
American superhero films
Superhero horror films
1989 comedy films
1980s English-language films
1980s American films